Purfleet is a small suburb of the Greater Taree region, located within the Mid-Coast Council local government area of New South Wales, Australia.

At the 2016 census, the town reported a resident population of 127. The median age was 30.

Indigenous presence
Purfleet was previously the site of an Aboriginal reserve, originally known as Sunshine Station, established by the Aborigines Protection Board in 1900. A mission school operated on the reserve from 1903 until 1952. Aboriginal people from the area were relocated to the mission, and were not allowed to leave to go to town without the permission of the manager.

The Purfleet/Taree Local Aboriginal Land Council is located within the suburb, as is the Biripi Aboriginal Corporation Medical Centre.

Aunty Pat Davis-Hurst , a nationally recognised Aboriginal elder, healthcare worker and activist was born on the mission.

References

Suburbs of Mid-Coast Council